Saint Croix is an island in the Caribbean Sea, and a county and constituent district of the United States Virgin Islands (USVI), an unincorporated territory of the United States.

St. Croix is the largest of the islands in the territory, while the capital Charlotte Amalie is located on St. Thomas. As of the 2020 United States Census, St. Croix’s population was 41,004. St. Croix's nickname is "Twin City", for its two towns, Frederiksted on the western end and Christiansted on the northeast part of the island.

Name
The island's indigenous Taino name is Ay Ay ("the river"). Its indigenous Carib name is Cibuquiera ("the stony land"). Its modern name, Saint Croix, is derived from the French Sainte-Croix, itself a translation of the Spanish name Isla de la Santa Cruz (meaning "island of the Holy Cross"), given by Columbus in 1493. The French name was partially retained under Danish rule as Sankt Croix, and the island was finally given its current spelling following the US takeover in 1917. The associated demonym for the island is Crucian or Cruzan, derived from the original Spanish name.

History

Igneri pottery indicates that people's presence on the island from 1 to 700, followed by the Taíno from 700 to 1425, before the encroachment by the Caribs in 1425.  However, the island was devoid of habitation by 1590.

The island was inhabited by various indigenous groups during its prehistory. Christopher Columbus landed on Santa Cruz (Holy Cross), as he called it, on 14 November 1493, and immediately was attacked by the Kalinago, who lived at Salt River on the north shore. This is the first recorded fight between the Spanish and a New World native population, and Columbus gave the battle site the name Cabo de la Flecha (Cape of the Arrow). The Spanish never colonized the Islands, but most or all of the native population was eventually dispersed or killed. By the end of the 16th century, the islands were said to be uninhabited.

Dutch and English settlers landed at Saint Croix in 1625, joined by some French refugees from Saint Kitts. However, the English expelled the Dutch and French settlers, before they themselves were evicted by a Spanish invasion from Puerto Rico in August 1650. The Spanish occupation was short-lived, since a French force of 166 men attacked, and in the following year 1651 had established a colony of 300 on the island. From 1651 until 1664, the Knights of Malta (at the time a vassal state of the Kingdom of Sicily), ruled the island in the name of Louis XIV. The island then passed to the French West India Company. The colony was evacuated to San Domingo in 1695, when France battled the English and Dutch in the War of the Grand Alliance. The island then lay uninhabited and abandoned for another 38 years.

In 1725, St. Thomas Governor Frederik Moth encouraged the Danish West Indies Company's directors to consider purchasing Santa Cruz (Saint Croix). On 15 June 1733, France and Denmark-Norway concluded a treaty by which the Danish West India Company bought Saint Croix for 750,000 livres. Louis XV ratified the treaty on 28 June, and received half the payment in French coins, with the remaining half paid in 18 months. On 16 November 1733, Moth was named the first Danish governor of Saint Croix. The 1742 census lists 120 sugar plantations, 122 cotton plantations, and 1906 slaves, compared to 360 whites on the island. By 1754, the number of slaves had grown to 7,566. That year, King Frederick took direct control of Saint Croix from the company.

For nearly 200 years, Saint Croix, St. Thomas and St. John were known as the Danish West Indies. By the mid to late 18th century, "at the peak of the plantation economy, the enslaved population of Saint Croix numbered between 18,000 and 20,000, the white population ranging between 1,500 and 2,000".

Future Founding Father Alexander Hamilton and his brother lived with their mother Rachel Faucette on Saint Croix, after she returned to the island in 1765. Their residence was in the upper floor of a house at 34 Company Street, while Rachel used the lower floor as a shop selling food items. Within two years, however, Hamilton lost his father, James Hamilton, by abandonment, and his mother to death. Official documents from the island, a 1768 probate court testimony from his uncle, established Alexander's age at 13. By 1769, Hamilton's cousin, aunt, uncle, and grandmother had also died. His brother James became an apprentice carpenter, and Alexander Hamilton became the ward of Thomas Stevens, a merchant on King Street. Hamilton was soon clerking in the export-import business of Beekman and Cruger, at the intersection of King and King's Cross Streets.  In 1772, local businessmen funded Hamilton's further education in New York.

The slave trade was abolished in the Danish colonies in 1792, although the prohibition did not go into effect until the end of 1802. Existing enslaved people were freed in 1848, after the 1848 St. Croix Slave Revolt led by General "Buddhoe" Gottlieb.

The British occupation of the Danish West Indies took place at the end of March 1801, with the arrival of a British fleet at St Thomas. Denmark-Norway accepted the Articles of Capitulation and the British occupied the islands without a shot being fired. Their occupation lasted only until April 1802, when Britain returned the islands to Denmark-Norway.

A second British invasion of the Danish West Indies took place in December 1807, when a British fleet captured St Thomas on 22 December, and Saint Croix on 25 December. Denmark-Norway did not resist and the invasion again was bloodless. This occupation lasted until 20 November 1815. Both invasions were due to Denmark's alliance with France during the Napoleonic Wars. On the conclusion of a peace with France, the islands were returned to Denmark.

The island was shaken by the 1878 St. Croix labor riot.

In 1916, Denmark sold Saint Croix, St. Thomas, and St. John to the United States, formalizing the transfer in the Treaty of the Danish West Indies, in exchange for a sum of US$25 million in gold. In a national referendum on the issue, 64.2% of Danish voters approved the sale. An unofficial referendum held in the islands resulted in 99.83% vote in favor of the purchase. Formal transfer of the islands to the U.S. took place on 1 April 1917.

The island's inhabitants were granted United States citizenship in 1927. Industrialization of the island and its move away from an agrarian society took place in the 1960s. The 1972 Fountain Valley massacre, a mass shooting during a robbery at a golf club, led to a devastating reduction in tourism that lasted many years. The 2012 shutdown of the Hovensa refinery resulted in the loss of many jobs. Agriculture has seen a slow resurgence, due to an increase in demand for local produce and agricultural products.

In 1989, Hurricane Hugo struck the island with Category 4 winds. The United States Army, the Federal Bureau of Investigation, and the United States Marshals Service were ordered in to restore order.

Category 5 Hurricane Maria's weaker outer eyewall crossed St. Croix in September 2017; sustained winds reached over 150 mph and gusted up to 250 mph in some places on the western end of the island. Maria damaged or destroyed 70% of the buildings on St. Croix, including schools and the island's only hospital.

Geography

The easternmost point in the United States of America in the western hemisphere is Saint Croix's Point Udall. The terrain is rugged, though not extremely so. Most of the east end is quite hilly and steep, as is the north side from Christiansted west. From the north-side hills, a fairly even plain slopes down to the south coast; this was cultivated as the prime sugar land on the island.

Climate
The trade wind blows more or less along the length of the island. The hills of the western part of the island receive a good deal more rain than the east end; annual rainfall is on the whole extremely variable, averaging perhaps  a year. The east end of the island is a dry desert range with a substantial amount of cactus, while the west end has lush vegetation and palm trees. The island has multiple ecosystems in a small geographic area. Fairly severe and extended drought has always been a problem, particularly considering the lack of fresh ground water and lack of freshwater streams or rivers on the island. The island has a desalination plant, but most residential homes and businesses have built-in cisterns used to collect rainwater.

Demographics
Inhabitants are called Crucians  (frequently written as "Cruzans").

Due to Saint Croix's history of immigration, there is much debate as to what constitutes a native Crucian. The consensus in Crucian society is that if one is bahn ya ("born here" in Crucian dialect) on Saint Croix, they can claim to be Crucian, but not necessarily a native Crucian. Those considered to be the native Crucians (or by the more politically correct term: ancestral native Crucian) of Saint Croix are persons who can trace their ancestry to the era prior to U.S. Virgin Islands acquisition of American citizenship in 1927.  Ancestral native Crucians (approximately one-fourth to one-third of Saint Croix's population) largely consist of the descendants of enslaved Africans brought to the island by Europeans during the 18th and 19th centuries, as well as the descendants of paid laborers recruited by the Danes from the British and Dutch West Indies after the Danish emancipation law in 1848. As on other Caribbean islands, many ancestral natives are also descended from European settlers and planters that migrated to the West Indies during the 17th, 18th and 19th centuries. Due to a low number of European females in the colonial West Indies, many European males in colonial Saint Croix produced offspring with the majority African population, whose mixed-heritage descendants bear the surnames of their European ancestors. In addition, there are also a handful of ancestral families on the island (traditionally known as bukra) of full European ancestry.

Due to historical economic and political differences, as well as the remnants of a 19th-century caste system based on skin complexion, socioeconomic class differences among ancestral native Crucians can vary widely, even within the same family.  Most ancestral native Crucians today are employed by the Government of the Virgin Islands, although there are others who are involved in the tourism industry, as well as the legal and medical professions.

Puerto Rican migration was prevalent in the 1930s, '40s and '50s, when many Puerto Ricans relocated to Saint Croix for work after the collapse of the sugar industry.  However, the total population actually declined by 50% in the century preceding 1945.

The United States Navy purchase of two-thirds of the nearby Puerto Rican island of Vieques during World War II resulted in the displacement of thousands of Viequenses, many of whom relocated to Saint Croix because of its similar size and geography. The local holiday, Puerto Rico/U.S. Virgin Islands Friendship Day, has been celebrated since the 1960s on the second Monday of October, which is also the same date as Columbus Day. Puerto Ricans in Saint Croix, most of whom have lived on the island for more than a generation, have kept their culture alive while integrating it into the native Crucian culture and society. For example, in informal situations, many Puerto Ricans in Saint Croix speak a unique Spanglish-like combination of Puerto Rican Spanish and the local Crucian Creole English.

Migration from "down-island" (a local colloquial term for islands in the Lesser Antilles located to the east and southeast), occurred mainly throughout the 1960s and 70s. In that period, agriculture declined as the major industry in Saint Croix and was replaced by tourism, alumina production, and oil refining. Jobs were plentiful in these industries and down-islanders came to Saint Croix by the thousands. The demand for imported labor in Saint Croix was exacerbated by the fact that many ancestral native Crucians, having acquired American citizenship several decades earlier, migrated to the mainland United States to pursue educational and career opportunities.  Many down-islanders made Saint Croix their permanent home, while others eventually relocated to the mainland United States or returned to their native countries. Most down-islanders came from St. Kitts and Nevis, Antigua, St. Lucia and Dominica, although people from every Anglophone Caribbean nation can be easily found on St. Croix.  Down islanders and their Saint Croix-born offspring form the majority of Saint Croix's middle class, which has dwindled in size since the 2008 global recession.

Although down-island migration to Saint Croix is most commonly thought of as a mid-20th century phenomenon brought upon by American immigration policy, it is important to note that persons of both European and African descent from the nearby islands of Anguilla, St. Martin, Sint Eustatius, Saba, St. Kitts, Nevis, Antigua, and Montserrat have been migrating to Saint Croix since the 1600s. In addition, many ancestral native Crucians also share family ties with Barbados, as Bajans were heavily recruited to Saint Croix to work on sugar plantations throughout the late 19th century.

Continental Americans, although small in number in comparison with Caribbean immigrants, have also been part of the Saint Croix community. Most reside on the East End of Saint Croix and tend to work in the tourism industry, real estate, and legal professions. Many are temporary residents or retirees, as well.

Arab Palestinians have been an influential part of the local economy since the 1960s, when they first started to migrate to St. Croix to set up shops, supermarkets and gas stations.

In the 21st century, recent waves of migration to Saint Croix have included people from the Dominican Republic, Haiti, Jamaica, the Philippines, and various South American nations.

Saint Croix's history of migration has sometimes caused tensions between immigrants and Crucians whose ancestry on the island dates back for generations. Tensions have subsided to some extent in recent years, mainly due to intermarriage among Crucians and other Caribbean peoples. In the late 1990s, many people supported legislation to define as a "native U.S. Virgin Islander" anyone who could trace their ancestry on the island to 1927, the year in which U.S. Virgin Islanders were granted United States citizenship. This effort by a select group of nationalist senators eventually failed after much public outcry and controversy. It was learned that most native-born U.S. Virgin Islanders would not qualify as "native" under the proposed legislation, as their immigrant ancestors had arrived later than 1927, but thousands of Danish citizens would have qualified.

In 2009, the proposed U.S. Virgin Islands Constitution voted by the Fifth Constitutional Convention established three definitions of U.S. Virgin Islanders: "Ancestral Native Virgin Islander" – those with ancestral ties (and their descendants); "Native Virgin Islander" – those born on the island (and their descendants); and "Virgin Islander" – any United States citizen who has resided in the territory for five years. The proposed constitution was rejected by the United States Congress in 2010 for violating the principle of equal rights for all citizens of the territory, "native" or not, and was sent back to the convention for further consideration.

The total population of the island as per the 2010 U.S. Census is 50,601.

Subdivisions
 
Saint Croix is divided into the following subdistricts (with population as per the 2010 U.S. Census):
 Anna's Hope Village (pop. 4,041)
 Christiansted (pop. 2,626)
 East End (pop. 2,453)
 Frederiksted (pop. 3,091)
 Northcentral (pop. 4,977)
 Northwest (pop. 4,863)
 Sion Farm (pop. 13,003)
 Southcentral (pop. 8,049)
 Southwest (pop. 7,498)

Language
English has been the dominant language on St. Croix since the 1700s and has been the official language since 1917, when the Danish West Indies were purchased by the United States. Previously, the official language was Danish, although it was not widely spoken. Other languages spoken throughout St. Croix's colonial history have included Irish, Scots, Spanish, and French, as well as a now-extinct Dutch Creole spoken by St. Thomas and St. John-born people living in St. Croix, as well as the local creole English, which still exists today.

Known on the island as Crucian, Virgin Islands Creole English is spoken by the majority of the population in informal situations. Spanish is spoken by migrants from Puerto Rico and the Dominican Republic and their St. Croix-born offspring, and various French creoles are spoken by St. Lucian, Dominican (Dominica), and Haitian immigrants. Arabic is common among the large Palestinian community on St. Croix.  Immigrants from the Anglophone Caribbean that migrated to St. Croix after their formative years tend to speak the English creoles of their respective islands in informal situations, which are, for the most part, mutually intelligible with Virgin Islands Creole English.

Religion

Christianity is the predominant religion; the island has been called the "Land of Churches" for the approximately 150 churches that serve its 50,000 residents.

Protestant denominations are the most prevalent, but there is also a significant Roman Catholic presence due to Saint Croix's large Hispanic population, as well as Irish influence during the Danish colonial period. Anglican, Methodist, Moravian, Presbyterian, Pentecostal and Seventh-day Adventists are among the Protestant denominations prevalent on the island. There are also followers of the Jehovah's Witness faith, as well as the Church of Jesus Christ of Latter-day Saints.

As in most of the Caribbean, various forms of Rastafari are practiced on the island. Islam is prevalent among the small local Arab population, and there is a small Jewish presence as well. Hinduism and Islam is also practiced by the Indian population.

Economy

Saint Croix was once an agricultural powerhouse in the Caribbean, but this period ended with the rapid industrialization of the island's economy in the 1960s. Like many other Caribbean islands today, Saint Croix has tourism as one of its main sources of revenue. A number of other industries on the island contribute to the economy.

Saint Croix was home to HOVENSA, one of the world's largest oil refineries. HOVENSA is a limited liability company owned and operated by Hess Oil Virgin Islands Corp. (HOVIC), a division of U.S.-based Hess Corporation, and Petroleos de Venezuela, SA (PDVSA), the national oil company of Venezuela. Gas prices on the island were slightly higher than average when compared to gas prices in the continental United States.

On January 18, 2012, the company announced that the HOVENSA refinery would be permanently shut down. This had a major adverse effect on the economy of Saint Croix and the entire U.S. Virgin Islands, as the refinery employed 1,200 residents and 950 contractors. The refinery has since reopened under new ownership.

Saint Croix is also home to the Cruzan Rum Distillery, makers of Cruzan Rum, a brand of Beam Suntory, Inc.  The Cruzan Rum Distillery was founded in 1760 as Estate Diamond, and for many years used locally grown sugar cane to produce a single "dark"-style rum. The distillery now imports sugar cane molasses from other countries in the region, primarily from the Dominican Republic and South America. In recent years, Cruzan Rum, along with Bacardi from Puerto Rico and Gosling's from Bermuda, has contributed to the resurgence of "single barrel," super-premium rum. The quality and smoothness of the Cruzan Estate Rums has won more than 30 Spirit Awards. Cruzan Estate Diamond Rum (aged five years in American oak barrels) and Cruzan Single Barrel Estate Rum (aged 12 years in American oak barrels) are two examples.

Diageo has completed construction of a new distillery on a 26-acre industrial site next to the Hovensa Refinery. The new distillery produces Captain Morgan Rum. Diageo's entrance into the U.S. Virgin Islands rum industry has been controversial. The cash-strapped U.S. Virgin Islands government secured $250 million in bonds for the plant, about which the Puerto Rican government has bitterly complained.

Transportation

Cars drive on the left hand side of the road, but nearly all the automobiles on the island have left side steering columns. This has proven difficult for new residents and visitors from right-hand traffic locales such as the mainland United States, the French and Dutch West Indies, the Dominican Republic, and Puerto Rico. Roads are with numerous potholes.

There is a public bus service called Virgin Islands Transit, also known as VITRAN, operated by the Virgin Islands Department of Public Works.

In addition to taxis and buses, St. Croix has shared taxis, locally known as "taxi buses" (also found on the other U.S. Virgin Islands). Taxi buses are full-sized vans running a route from Frederiksted to Christiansted. Taxi buses are privately owned and operated; they do not follow a regular schedule, and there are no pre-specified stops. People simply wait by the side of the road until a taxi bus approaches, then flag the driver down by waving. Passengers can get out anywhere along the taxi route. Taxi buses are not metered and are required by law to charge a flat rate of $2.50, regardless of where a rider gets on and off. Taxis to specific locations are much more expensive and are typically used by tourists.

Ferry service to St. Thomas was restarted in April 2017. The QE IV Ferry makes one trip per day departing from Gallows Bay, Christiansted to Charlotte Amalie, St. Thomas. The journey takes 2.5 hours and costs $50. The QE IV Ferry does not operate during hazardous weather conditions. Some Ferry companies based in St. Thomas and St. John sometimes operate St. Croix-to-St. Thomas service for special occasions, such as the St. Croix Agricultural Fair in February, Virgin Islands Carnival, Crucian Christmas Carnival, as well as horse races.

The Henry E. Rohlsen International Airport serves St. Croix with regular flights from the U.S. mainland, Puerto Rico, and the Eastern Caribbean. Seaplanes, operated by Seaborne Airlines, make the trip from St. Croix to St. Thomas, departing and arriving in Christiansted Harbor.

Although St. Croix is a U.S. territory, the U.S. Virgin Islands are maintained as a free port in a separate customs zone. Therefore, travelers to and from the contiguous United States and Puerto Rico must clear U.S. customs but do not need to present a passport, and only need proof of U.S. citizenship or nationality. The immigration status of non-U.S. citizens may be verified during this process.

Education
The St. Croix School District operates a number of  public schools in St. Croix. There also exist multiple private schools, including St. Croix Montessori, Star Apple Montessori School, The Good Hope Country Day School, AZ Academy, St. Mary's Catholic School, Free Will Baptist, St. Croix SDA School, and The Manor School. The only colleges on the island are the University of the Virgin Islands, St. Croix campus and Barry University, which operates a physician assistant training program.

Culture

Festivals
The island's largest festival, termed "Crucian Christmas Carnival," is celebrated on St. Croix throughout late December and early January. Another significant festival is the Agricultural and Food Fair held in mid-February.

Several times a year, there is a nighttime festival in Christiansted called "Jump-Up" and a monthly event called "Sunset Jazz" in Frederiksted, where local jazz musicians play on Frederiksted Beach. Every year on the Saturday before Mardi Gras, there is a local Mardi Croix parade and a dog parade through the North Shore.

The St. Croix Half Ironman Triathlon is held in the first week of May. The Triathlon includes a  swim, a  bike ride, and a  run. Because the bicycle route includes a ride up an extremely steep hill known as "The Beast", this triathlon is often nicknamed "Beauty and the Beast".

Points of interest

Frederiksted maintains its Victorian era architecture and original seven street by seven street city design and is host to several historic structures. Among them are St. Patrick's Catholic Church built in the 1840s and its primary school, the Customs House, the 19th Century Apothecary, and many other buildings; some of which due to hurricanes past have fallen into very scenic ruins. Frederiksted operates at a more relaxed pace than most of the island, and is more lively during Carnival in January and whenever visiting cruise ships are in port.

Salt River Bay National Historical Park and Ecological Preserve contains the only known site where members of a Columbus expedition set foot on what is now United States territory. It also preserves upland watersheds, mangrove forests, and estuarine and marine environments that support threatened and endangered species. The site is marked by Fort Salé, a remaining earthworks fortification from the French period of occupation, about 1617. The park also preserves prehistoric and colonial-era archeological sites including the only existent example of a ball court in the Caribbean. This is one of two sites on the island for bioluminescent bays (the other being Altona Lagoon).

Fort Christiansværn built in 1749 and other buildings are maintained by the National Park Service as the Christiansted National Historic Site.

Buck Island Reef National Monument preserves a  island just north of St. Croix and the surrounding reefs. This is a popular destination for snorkelers. Buck Island maintains a U.S. Coast Guard weather station and is also home to a student monitored lemon shark breeding ground. Green Cay (pronounced green key) is a small island located southwest of Buck Island; it is managed by the US Fish and Wildlife Service. It hosts a nearby reef popular among scuba divers and snorkelists—Tamarind Reef.

The farmer's market  (1 Estate, Kingshill, 00850, St. Croix) offers local fruit and vegetables, as well as plants, local food, and delicious juices. The outdoor vendors open every Saturday from 6 a.m. to 12 p.m., sometimes longer. You can visit the farmer's market all-year round to taste the fresh fruit and vegetables and enjoy a typical Cruzan breakfast.

The St. Croix National Heritage Area was established in the National Heritage Area Act in 2022. The National Heritage Area will help preserve and promote historic and cultural sites across the island.

Scuba diving, snorkeling, and watersports

The waters surrounding St. Croix are warm year-round, with temperatures ranging from  – , making it a popular destination for watersports including scuba diving, snorkeling, kayaking, paddleboarding, surfing, kite surfing, parasailing, jet skiing, fishing, and sailing. Two of the island's most popular underwater sites for scuba divers are the Frederiksted Pier and the drop-off into deep water at Salt River Bay National Historical Park and Ecological Preserve.

Frederiksted is known for reef diving and access to wreck diving. The western side of the island has calm waters that allow snorkeling with access from the beach. Paddleboarding is popular near Frederiksted for the same reason. The Frederiksted Pier attracts scuba divers and snorkelers, as well as those who simply jump off it. The shallow water and sandy bottom around the pier are ideal for recreational diving by novice scuba divers in PADI Discover Scuba Diving programs (also called resort diving), for extended shore diving, night diving, and for underwater photography, especially of its abundant seahorse population.

A few hundred meters off the northern coast of the island, from Salt River to Cane Bay, the bottom drops suddenly into a deep trench, where coral reefs, abundant tropical fish, and migrant sea turtles may be observed. Kayaking is popular in the Salt River area as well.

The town of Christiansted, a short distance from Buck Island and Green Cay, is a former capital of the Danish West Indies. It lies just east of the northern underwater drop-off and is protected by a reef.

Bioluminescent bays

There are two bioluminescent bays or bio bays on St. Croix. The most widely known and visited is located at Salt River Bay National Historical Park and Ecological Preserve. A second bio bay can be found at Altona Lagoon. Bio bays are extremely rare with "only seven-year-round lagoons known to exist in the Caribbean".

A combination of factors creates the necessary conditions for bioluminescence: red mangrove trees surround the water (the organisms have been related to mangrove forest, although mangrove is not necessarily associated with this species). A study at the bio bay located at Salt River is being conducted  by faculty and students from the University of South Carolina, the University of North Carolina-Wilmington and the University of the Virgin Islands. Their research is focused on analyzing quality and nutrient composition of the water, the distribution of a micro-organism, the dinoflagellate Pyrodinium bahamense, which glows whenever the water is disturbed, and the abundance of "cysts", dormant dinoflagellates embedded in the sea floor.

A concurrent complementary study is being undertaken by the St. Croix Environmental Association in conjunction with Scripps Institution of Oceanography which focuses on counting the photon density of the phenomenon over time and through various conditions of weather and other impacts. Water quality and taxonomic analysis from both studies will be shared and correlated to create one of the most thorough investigations of year-round bioluminescent bays to date.

The two bio bays on St Croix have very different characteristics. The one at Altona Lagoon is large in size but is very shallow allowing one to see the various marine life swimming and agitating the water, lighting it up. The bio bay at Salt River is smaller in size but is deeper than Altona Lagoon. Because of its depth this bay is also home to a second form of bioluminescence called Ctenophora or comb-jellies, which are not found at Altona Lagoon.

A third bioluminescent organism is also found in Salt River. A species of marine Odontosyllis fireworm performs its brilliant green mating ritual within 57 hours after the full moon, females rising to the surface and leaving a luminescent green puddle for the males to race through, fertilizing the eggs.

Protected areas
 Buck Island Reef National Monument, managed by the National Park Service (a federal agency)
 Christiansted National Historic Site, managed by the National Park Service (a federal agency)
 Green Cay National Wildlife Refuge, managed by the US Fish and Wildlife Service (a federal agency)
 Salt River Bay National Historical Park and Ecological Preserve, co-managed by the Territory of the Virgin Islands and the National Park Service (a federal agency)
 Sandy Point National Wildlife Refuge, managed by the US Fish and Wildlife Service (a federal agency)
 Point Udall
 St. Croix East End Marine Park: managed by the Government of the Virgin Islands through the Department of Planning and Natural Resources' Division of Coastal Zone Management

Notable people 
Hans Jonatan (1784–1827), possibly the first person of color to live in Iceland
Joe Aska, former professional American football running back
Raja Bell, professional basketball player, Utah Jazz
De Apostle, reggae singer-songwriter
Bennie Benjamin, musician, songwriter
Judah P. Benjamin, American and Confederate politician
Cory Bishop, U.S. Virgin Islands soccer player
Victor Borge, Danish pianist and comedian
Edmund Bourke (1761–1821), Danish diplomat
Livingstone Bramble, boxer (raised on St. Croix) from Montserrat
Georg Carstensen, Danish engineer founder of Tivoli Gardens
Annie de Chabert, political figure, entrepreneur
Horace Clarke, professional baseball player, New York Yankees and San Diego Padres
Quentin Coryatt, professional NFL American football player, Indianapolis Colts
Frank Crosswaith – union leader
Francis J. D'Eramo, Judge at the United States Virgin Islands Superior Court of St. Croix.
Dezarie, reggae singer
Tim Duncan, former professional NBA basketball player 
Walt Frazier, former professional NBA basketball player
Jack Gantos, author (mentioned in Hole in My Life)
Muhammad Halim, Olympic triple jumper
Alexander Hamilton, American statesman, first United States Secretary of the Treasury (born on Nevis)
Jimmy Hamilton, jazz musician
Hubert Harrison, Harlem activist and intellectual "The Father of Harlem Radicalism"
Elizabeth Hawes, clothing designer, author and social critic, who wrote a book about her life in St. Croix titled But Say It Politely
Casper Holstein, Harlem Renaissance philanthropist
Roy Innis, civil rights advocate, chairman, Congress of Racial Equality (CORE)
Rea Irvin, illustrator and first art director on The New Yorker magazine
Peter Jackson, 19th-century Australian boxing champion
Linval Joseph, professional NFL American football player, Minnesota Vikings
William Alexander Leidesdorff, entrepreneur
Audre Lorde, poet, feminist
Midnite, roots reggae band
Abraham Markoe, American revolutionary figure
Hanik Milligan, former professional American football player
Warren Mosler, economist
Richard Cooper Newick, boat builder and designer
Maureen O'Hara, actress
Regine Olsen, Kierkeegard's former fiancée, whose husband Johan Frederik Schlegel was the island's governor
Elmo Plaskett, baseball player
Jasmin St. Claire, pornographic actress
Sugar Ray Seales, Olympic gold medalist, boxer
Jim Simpson, Hall of Fame sportscaster
Allen Stanford, financier convicted of fraud
Andre Wadsworth, professional NFL American football player, Arizona Cardinals
Hannibal Ware, Inspector General of the U.S. Small Business Administration
Erika J. Waters, academic and critic
Henry S. Whitehead, American author of horror fiction and fantasy
Mike Yard, contributor on The Nightly Show

See also
1878 St. Croix Labor Riots
Culture of the Virgin Islands
Music of the Virgin Islands
St. George Village Botanical Garden
Virgin Islands patch reefs
WSVI, ABC TV station
WTJX-TV, Virgin Island Public Television

Notes

References

External links

St. Croix – United States Virgin Islands Department of Tourism
Office of the Lieutenant Governor – Office of the Lieutenant Governor Gregory R. Francis
St. Croix USVI Google Map – Satellite Map of St. Croix, USVI

Islands of the United States Virgin Islands
 
Places with bioluminescence
Former Danish colonies
1650 establishments in the French colonial empire
1733 disestablishments in the French colonial empire
1733 establishments in the Danish colonial empire
1916 disestablishments in the Danish colonial empire
1916 establishments in the United States